Allen University is a private historically black university in Columbia, South Carolina. It has more than 600 students and still serves a predominantly Black constituency. The campus is listed on the National Register of Historic Places as Allen University Historic District.

History
Allen University was founded in Cokesbury in 1870 as Payne Institute by ministers of the African Methodist Episcopal Church, including John M. Brown. Its initial mission was to provide education to freedmen, former African American slaves and their children.

In 1880, it was moved to Columbia and renamed Allen University in honor of Bishop Richard Allen, founder of the African Methodist Episcopal Church. The university remains connected to the denomination, which is related to other Methodist churches. As one of two black colleges located in Columbia, Allen has a very strong presence in the African-American community.  Allen University initially focused on training ministers and teachers, who were considered critical to the progress of African Americans. Over the years, it has enlarged its scope to produce graduates in other academic areas.

In 1885, Joseph W. Morris became president of the university. By 1898, the university reported having a total of 9 faculty, 304 students, and 208 graduates.

Academics 
The university is accredited by the Southern Association of Colleges and Schools to offer Bachelor of Arts and Bachelor of Science degrees. These degrees are awarded in the following divisions and departments:

 Division of Humanities
 Department of English
 Department of Music
Division of Social Sciences
 Division of Mathematics and Natural Sciences
 Department of Biology
 Department of Chemistry
 Department of Mathematics
 Division of Business Administration
 Division of Religion

In 2010, Washington Monthly reported in its annual College Guide edition that the school had a six percent graduation rate. In 2018, Allen University launched its first graduate program, the Dickerson-Green Theological Seminary. Under the seminary's founding dean, Dr. Jamal-Dominique Hopkins, Dickerson-Green Theological Seminary gained member status with the Association of Theological Schools in the United States and Canada to offer the Master of Arts in Religion and Master of Divinity degrees.

Campus

Buildings such as Arnett Hall, the Chappelle Administration Building, Coppin Hall, the Joseph Simon Flippen Library, and the Canteen Building are included in what is designated as the Allen University Historic District, listed in 1975 on the National Register of Historic Places.

In addition to its National Register of Historic Places status, Allen University Historic District falls within the boundaries of Waverly Protection Area, a Preservation District within the City of Columbia Urban Design and Historic Preservation District system. This Preservation District is an expansion of Waverly Historic District. 

Several of the district's buildings were restored, using $2.9 million in funds obtained through the Historically Black Colleges and Universities Historic Building Restoration and Preservation Act. Chappelle Auditorium's seating capacity of 700 has made it the site of countless organizations' and community events.

The auditorium was the site of the meeting of educators and lawyers to initiate efforts that led to the landmark US Supreme Court case Brown v. Board of Education (1954) on school integration. Nationally known musicians and artists, including Leontyne Price, Brook Benton and Langston Hughes, have performed in the auditorium. Notable speakers include: Mary McCleod Bethune, Rev. Martin Luther King Jr., Muhammad Ali, Reverend Jesse Jackson, George Elmore, John H. McCray, and Senator Strom Thurmond. The auditorium was named in honor of Bishop William D. Chappelle, an Allen University President.  On April 14, 1975, Chappelle Administration Building was recognized by the U.S. Department of the Interior and placed on the National Register of Historic Places.

Chappelle Administration Building was designed by John Anderson Lankford (1874-1946), who is known as the "Dean of Black Architects". It is a National Historic Landmark. Lankford also served as the official architect of the AME Church.

Adams Gymnatorium
Arnett Hall
Cafeteria
Chappelle Administration Building (a National Historic Landmark)
Coppin Hall
Counseling Center
Dickerson-Green Theological Seminary House
Flipper Library
Higgins Hall
Mance House
Reid Hall
Richard Allen Apartments
Williams Living and Learning Complex

Student life 
Allen University is the home of more than 15 on-campus student organizations.

Academic organizations/honor societies 
 Sigma Tau Delta, International English Honor Society
 Chi Pi Chapter
 Pi Gamma Mu International Honor Society in the Social Sciences 
 South Carolina Nu Chapter
 Phi Beta Lambda
 Sigma Phi Omega

National Pan-Hellenic Council organizations 
Allen University has eight of the nine national black fraternities and sororities of the National Pan-Hellenic Council present on campus.

Athletics 
The Allen athletic teams are called the Yellow Jackets. The university is a member of the NCAA Division II ranks, primarily competing in the Southern Intercollegiate Athletic Conference (SIAC) as a provisional member since the 2020–21 academic year (achieving D-II full member status in 2022–23); which they were a member on a previous stint from 1947–48 to 1968–69. The Yellow Jackets previously competed in the Appalachian Athletic Conference (AAC) of the National Association of Intercollegiate Athletics (NAIA) from 2016–17 to 2019–20; as an NAIA Independent within the Association of Independent Institutions (AII) from 2005–06 to 2015–16; and in the defunct Eastern Intercollegiate Athletic Conference (EIAC) from 1983–84 to 2004–05.

Allen competes in 11 intercollegiate varsity sports. Men's sports include basketball, cross country, football, track & field and wrestling; while women's sports include basketball, cross country, soccer, softball, track & field, volleyball, and wrestling. The university also fields a co-ed competitive cheerleading team.

Move to NCAA Division II 
Beginning in the 2020–21 academic year, the Yellow Jackets will compete as a provisional member of Division II of the NCAA. They will compete alongside their next-door rival, the Benedict Tigers, in the SIAC. The Yellow Jackets will complete the reclassification process and be considered full members of Division II in 2023.

Marching band 
Following the reinstatement of the football program in 2018, the marching band, known as the Band of Gold, was reinstated under the direction of former Marching 101 director Eddie Ellis.

Notable alumni

References

External links

 Official website
 Official athletics website

 
University and college buildings on the National Register of Historic Places in South Carolina
Private universities and colleges in South Carolina
Historically black universities and colleges in the United States
Universities and colleges affiliated with the African Methodist Episcopal Church
Education in Columbia, South Carolina
Educational institutions established in 1870
Universities and colleges accredited by the Southern Association of Colleges and Schools
African-American history of South Carolina
Buildings and structures in Columbia, South Carolina
National Register of Historic Places in Columbia, South Carolina
Historic districts on the National Register of Historic Places in South Carolina
1870 establishments in South Carolina